University of Bradford School of Management is an international business school located in Bradford, West Yorkshire, England. It was established in 1963 and is one of the oldest business schools in the UK. The school is triple-crown accredited - AACSB, AMBA and EQUIS.

Until summer 2019 it occupied buildings near Lister Park. The school was relocated to the University of Bradford City Campus for teaching from September 2019.

The School of Management is believed to be the origin of the Bradford factor, an absence review technique in HRM.

Introduction
The School of Management provides undergraduate, postgraduate and doctoral degrees in management, including MBA (Master of Business Administration) courses; as well as non-degree courses for business executives.

Currently, the school has over 1300 undergraduates, over 1100 postgraduates on taught courses and 120 doctoral students. The current establishment of the school is some 56 academic faculty with 13 support staff.

Around 80 students graduate from the full-time MBA each year, and 25 from the part-time MBA. The school also offers part-time Executive MBA courses for around 50 students per year and courses abroad such as the Dubai MBA, as well as a master's degree in finance, international business, management, accounting, and HRM.

Accreditation
The Business School is triple accredited by European Quality Improvement System (EQUIS), Association to Advance Collegiate Schools of Business (AACSB) and Association of MBAs (AMBA), which often referred as the Triple Crown accreditation.

Ranking
According to the Financial Times, the School of Management is ranked 9th in the UK. Worldwide, the school is ranked in 95th place in the Financial Times Global MBA Rankings 2012. The distance learning MBA program is ranked by the Economist Intelligence Unit 10th in the World.

In 2018, it was ranked as the 14th best overall in the world, 3rd best in the UK and best in the world when it comes to value for money for Online MBA in business schools by Financial Times.

In 2021, the University of Bradford School of Management was awarded as the best Business School of the year 2021 in the UK by the Times Higher Education's THE Awards.

Courses
Courses taught at the school include postgraduate degrees (MBA, Masters, and Research programmes) and undergraduate degrees (such as BSc Business and Management Studies)

References

External links
University of Bradford School of Management website

Bradford
Management
Education in Bradford
1963 establishments in England
Educational institutions established in 1963